Braehoulland is a hamlet on Mainland, in Shetland, Scotland. Braehoulland is situated within the parish of Northmaven. Eshaness Community Centre is located in Braehoulland.

There is a caravan site and a cafe located at the farmstead of Braewick, just south of the main cluster of buildings. Braewick beach is on a south-facing bay, with cliffs at the east and west sides, and with dramatic sea stacks further to the east.

References

External links

Canmore - Loch Of Braehoulland site record
Canmore - Braeswick Loch site record
Canmore - Braewick, Norse Mills site record

Villages in Mainland, Shetland
Northmavine